Par in parem non habet imperium (Latin for "equals have no sovereignty over each other") is a general principle of international law, forming the basis of state immunity. Because of this principle, a sovereign state cannot exercise jurisdiction over another sovereign state.

References 

Brocards (law)
International law
Legal rules with Latin names